The State Barge of Charles II is a  British royal barge constructed around 1670 for the use of Charles II, for events now known as fleet reviews. In January 1806 it was used to carry the coffin of Lord Nelson to St Paul's Cathedral for his funeral. By about 1870 it was on display on HMS Victory, where it remained until the 1920s when it was removed during Victory's restoration. It is currently kept in the National Museum of the Royal Navy in Portsmouth.

Design 
The barge is a type of boat known as a shallop; it has a rounded bow and a square-shaped stern (known as a lute stern). It has rowlocks for five oars on each side. The stern has a portrait of the Duchess of Portsmouth, Louise de Kerouaille, a mistress of Charles II.

See also
Queen Mary's Shallop
Prince Frederick's Barge 
Gloriana

References

External links 
 

Barges
Museum ships in the United Kingdom
17th-century ships
Charles II of England
Ships preserved in museums